Elections to Bury Metropolitan Borough Council were held on 10 June 2004.  The whole council was up for election with boundary changes since the last election in 2003. The number of councillors increased from 48 to 51, with the addition on North Manor Ward, as well as other boundary changes, therefore it is not possible to show seats gained and lost. The top 3 candidates in each ward were elected.

The Labour Party retained control of the council.

After the election, the composition of the council was
Labour 27
Conservative 19
Liberal Democrat 5

Election result

Ward results

References

2004 English local elections
2004
2000s in Greater Manchester